Pešterac is a Serbian surname, a demonym derived from Pešter. It may refer to:

Dalibor Pešterac (born 1976), former Serbian footballer
Miladin Pešterac (1960–2007), former Serbian footballer

Serbian surnames